The SEC Armadillo (originally known as the Clyde Auditorium) is an auditorium located near the River Clyde, in Glasgow, Scotland. It is one of three venues on the Scottish Event Campus, which includes the SEC Centre and the OVO Hydro.

History

Plans for a new building to increase the capacity of the SECC complex were initiated in 1994. Designed by architects Foster and Partners, construction of the 3,000 seat venue  started in September 1995, and was completed in August 1997, by which time it had earned its affectionate nickname, due to the similarity of its shape to that of the animal of the same name.

Many comparisons have been made with the Sydney Opera House, although this was not the architects' inspiration for the design, which was in fact an interlocking series of ship's hulls, in reference to the Clyde's shipbuilding heritage.

The building has become one of the most recognisable on Clydeside and an iconic image of Glasgow. It is connected by passageways to the SEC Centre, and the Crowne Plaza hotel for easy access and exit for performers.

Events
The building has held events, such as the Scottish auditions of Britain's Got Talent 2008 to 2010, the auditions for the first four editions of The X Factor and the Hugo Award ceremony during Interaction, the 63rd World Science Fiction Convention. Singer Susan Boyle was discovered at this venue.

The building served as the venue for the weightlifting competitions of the 2014 Commonwealth Games, held in Glasgow. In the season of Christmas, the Armadillo is used for pantomimes..

References

External links

 Scottish Event Campus
 Photographs of the (Armadillo) Clyde Auditorium in Glasgow InGlasgow.com (Archived)
 SECC Armadillo features in Delhi Clyde Waterfront, 15 October 2010

1997 establishments in Scotland
2014 Commonwealth Games venues
Cultural infrastructure completed in 1997
Culture in Glasgow
Exhibition and conference centres in Scotland
Foster and Partners buildings
High-tech architecture
Lattice shell structures
Music venues completed in 1997
Music venues in Glasgow
Tourist attractions in Glasgow